Kieran Sporn (born 28 August 1966) is a former Australian rules footballer who played with  and  in the Australian Football League (AFL) from 1989-94.

Career
Originally from South Australia where he played for South Australian National Football League (SANFL) club West Adelaide, winning the club's Sam Suckling Medal as the best first year player in 1986, and the club Best & Fairest in 1987. 

Sporn moved to Melbourne in 1989 to play for VFL team Essendon. He played 19 consecutive games during his debut season before a knee injury ending the streak. He played five seasons for Essendon, then one season for Fitzroy in 1994, before retiring.

Family
Kieran Sporn's younger sister is Olympic basketballer Rachael Sporn.

External links

1966 births
Living people
Australian rules footballers from South Australia
Essendon Football Club players
Fitzroy Football Club players
West Adelaide Football Club players